Coptosapelta is a genus of flowering plants in the family Rubiaceae. It is found in tropical and subtropical Asia. The genus has not been placed within a subfamily and is sister to the rest of Rubiaceae.

Species

 Coptosapelta beccari Valeton
 Coptosapelta carrii Merr. & L.M.Perry
 Coptosapelta diffusa (Champ. ex Benth.) Steenis
 Coptosapelta flavescens Korth.
 Coptosapelta fuscescens Valeton
 Coptosapelta griffithii Hook.f.
 Coptosapelta hameliiblasta (Wernham) Valeton
 Coptosapelta hammii Valeton
 Coptosapelta janowskii Valeton
 Coptosapelta laotica Valeton
 Coptosapelta lutescens Valeton
 Coptosapelta maluensis Valeton
 Coptosapelta montana Korth. ex Valeton
 Coptosapelta olaciformis (Merr.) Elmer
 Coptosapelta parviflora Ridl.
 Coptosapelta valetonii Merr.

References

External links
Coptosapelta in the World Checklist of Rubiaceae

Rubiaceae genera
Coptosapelteae